Correbia semitransversa is a moth of the subfamily Arctiinae. It was described by Schaus in 1911. It is found in Costa Rica.

References

Euchromiina
Moths described in 1911